For the 1934 Isle of Man TT Races despite the winning of four TT Races in 2 years, Stanley Woods parted with Norton motor-cycles over the issue of prize money and race tactics and joined Husqvarna alongside Ernie Nott.

The 1934 Junior TT Race was won by Jimmie Guthrie riding for Norton at an average race speed of 79.16 mph from Jimmie Simpson and Ernie Nott a distant third riding for the Swedish Husqvarna marque.

During the first lap of the 1934 Lightweight Race, Syd Crabtree, the winner of the 1929 Lightweight Race crashed at the Stonebreakers Hut on the Mountain Section and was killed. The 1934 Lightweight TT Race was won by Jimmie Simpson riding a Rudge motor-cycle in 3 hours, 23 minutes and 10 seconds at an average race speed of 70.81 mph. The 1934 Lightweight TT Race provided Rudge with another 1-2-3 win since the 1930 Junior TT Race and Jimmie Simpson's only TT Race victory winning from team-mates Ernie Nott and Graham Walker taking 2nd and 3rd places.

The 1934 Senior TT Race was led by Stanley Woods riding for Husqvarna but retired on the Mountain Section on the last lap after running-out of fuel. This handed a Junior/Senior double win to Jimmie Guthrie riding the works Norton at an average speed of 78.01 mph from Jimmie Simpson riding a Norton in his last TT Race and Walter Rusk with a Velocette.

Senior TT (500cc)
7 laps (264.11 miles) Mountain Course.

Junior TT (350cc)
7 laps (264.11 miles) Mountain Course.

Lightweight TT (250cc)
7 laps (264.11 miles) Mountain Course.

Notes
 Major alterations to the Snaefell mountain course are carried out for the 1934 TT Races. This includes the removal of the East Mountain sheep-gate.

Sources

External links
 Detailed race results
 Isle of Man TT winners
 Mountain Course map

Isle of Man TT
1934
Isle